Cynthia L. Nava is a former Democratic member of the New Mexico Senate.  She represented the 31st District from 1992 to 2012.

External links
Cynthia Nava at the NM Senate website
Cynthia Nava official campaign website
Project Vote Smart - Senator Cynthia L. Nava (NM) profile
Follow the Money - Cynthia Nava
2008 2006 2004 2002 2000 1996 1992 campaign contributions

Democratic Party New Mexico state senators
1952 births
Living people
People from Doña Ana County, New Mexico
Women state legislators in New Mexico
Eastern Illinois University alumni
Western Illinois University alumni
People from Las Cruces, New Mexico
21st-century American women